State Road 716 (SR 716), locally known as Port St. Lucie Boulevard or "PSL" Boulevard, is a  east–west route in Port St. Lucie, Florida, extending from its western terminus at an interchange with Florida's Turnpike (SR 91) to an intersection with U.S. Route 1 (US 1 or SR 5), its eastern terminus. The entire roadway, stretching from Indiantown at its western terminus in Martin County to its terminus 2 miles east of its intersection with US 1 in Port St. Lucie in St. Lucie County, currently carries three different designations - SR 716, CR 76A, and CR 726. The roadway east of US 1 and between CR 76A and SR 716 has no state or county designation.

Route description
33 miles from the extreme southern beginning of the roadway in Indiantown, the State Road 716 designation begins as a 6-lane roadway at the west end of the overpass carrying the road over Florida's Turnpike and its corresponding exit/entrance ramps with Port St. Lucie Blvd (Exit 142) in Port St. Lucie. Heading east, SR 716 is a mixed residential/commercial street throughout the entire length of the state road designation; the residences remain along the road from when the road was originally a 2-lane residential throughfare.  At the middle, SR 716 crosses over a pair of bridges over Long Creek and the North Fork of the St. Lucie River (both waterways part of the North Fork St. Lucie River Aquatic Preserve), the only undeveloped section of the road.  From here, Port St. Lucie Boulevard continues east through more residential/commercial development, where the SR 716 designation terminates at US 1. East of US 1, the road continues for 2 miles, undergoing 4 name changes along the way: SE Cane Slough Road, a 4-lane roadway (with a middle left turn lane, or "suicide lane") from US 1 to its intersection with SE Lennard Road, where it narrows to a 2-lane residential street for the remainder of its length; SE Mariposa Avenue; SE Hallahan Street; and finally SE Ibis Avenue, where the roadway ends at its intersection with SE Caladium Ave.

History
In the 1980s, the route of SR 716 was shown to extend westward from its current terminus at Florida's Turnpike to Interstate 95 (I-95), heading west and then south along Port St. Lucie Boulevard before turning westward along Gatlin Boulevard (formerly Savage Boulevard) towards I-95. Currently, that section is marked "active off the SHS" on the FDOT Straight Line Diagram for SR 716. As recently as 2000, a mileage sign on I-95 heading north after the interchange with Martin Highway (SR 714) listed "SR 716" as the next exit; it has since been covered over and now reads "Port St. Lucie." As late as 2006, many current editions of commercially-prepared road maps incorrectly show SR 716 with its original alignment west of the Turnpike, along Gatlin Boulevard west towards its interchange with I-95. Today, SR 716 signage can be found west of the interchange with the Turnpike.

In the early 2000s, an extension connecting Port St. Lucie Boulevard to Martin Highway (SR 714) at the intersection of Citrus Boulevard (County Road 76A) was completed. Citrus Boulevard south of Martin Highway is signed as County Road 76A and County Road 726, however, the 11 mile stretch of Citrus Boulevard/Port St. Lucie Boulevard between Martin Highway and Florida's Turnpike remain undesignated as a state or county road.

Major intersections

References

External links

716
716